This is a list containing the Billboard Hot Latin Tracks number-ones of 2001.

See also
Hot Latin Tracks

References

2001 record charts
Lists of Billboard Hot Latin Songs number-one songs
2001 in Latin music